Malayotyphlops ruber, also known as the Samar blind snake or red worm snake, is a species of snake in the family Typhlopidae. It is endemic to the Philippines, where it is widely distributed. Its type locality is Samar.

Malayotyphlops ruber occurs in secondary forest and wooded grasslands. It is a widespread and adaptable species that is not facing major threats. It is found in the Mount Apo National Park and Camotes Island Mangrove Swamp Forest Reserve.

References

ruber
Snakes of Asia
Reptiles of the Philippines
Endemic fauna of the Philippines
Taxa named by Oskar Boettger
Reptiles described in 1897